Favorite Hymns is the forty-fifth album by American singer/guitarist Glen Campbell, released in 1989 (see 1989 in music). In the liner notes, Campbell stated: "This album with the exception of "I See Love" and "Talk Oak Tree", is made up of songs I learned as a child, in a little country church in Billstown, Arkansas. What a great message in these songs. I thank God for the privileged of recording them".

Track listing
 "Standing on the Promises" (Traditional) – 2:33
 "What A Friend We Have in Jesus" (Traditional) – 3:08
 "Softly and Tenderly" (Traditional) – 3:46
 "Sweet Hour of Prayer" (Traditional) – 3:08
 "I Surrender All" (Traditional) – 3:13
 "The Lord's Prayer" (Albert Hay Malotte) – 2:22
 "Tall Oak Tree" (Dorsey Burnette) – 3:10
 "Sweet By and By" (Traditional) – 2:48
 "I See Love" (Micheal Smotherman) – 2:35
 "Farther Along" (Traditional) – 3:48
 "In the Garden" (C. Austin Miles) – 3:57
 "Suddenly There's a Valley" (Chuck Meyer, Biff Jones) – 2:56

Personnel
Glen Campbell – vocals, lead guitar
Kim Darigan – bass guitar
Craig Fall – guitar
T.J. Kuenster – piano, synthesizer
Steve Turner – drums

Production
Glen Campbell – producer
Marty Paich – producer, string arrangements and conductor
Tom Knox – rhythm engineer
Al Schmitt – string/mix engineer
Randall Martin – illustration
Tal Howell Design – design
Terri Short – art direction

References

Glen Campbell albums
1989 albums
Albums arranged by Marty Paich